Paul K. Stumpf (February 23, 1919 – February 10, 2007) was an American biochemist, "a world leader in the field of plant biochemistry" according to the National Academy of Sciences and the University of California.
Specifically the University of California said that "Stumpf pioneered the study of the biochemistry of lipids (fats and oils) in plants".
Stumpf was chairman of the department of Biochemistry and Biophysics,
a member of the National Academy of Sciences, and a fellow of the American Academy of Arts and Sciences.

He was a recipient of the following distinctions and awards:
 1961 and 1969: twice a Guggenheim Fellow.
 1974: the Stephen Hales Prize from the American Society of Plant Physiologists
 1975: elected a member of the Royal Danish Academy of Sciences
 1978: elected a member of the National Academy of Sciences
 1980: President of the American Society of Plant Physiologists
 1986-1990: chairman of the Board of Trustees of the American Society of Plant Physiologists
 1992: the Charles Reid Barnes Life Membership the American Society of Plant Physiologists
 the Lipid Chemistry Prize from the American Oil Chemists Society
 Senior Scientist Award from the Alexander von Humboldt Foundation of Germany
 1994: elected a fellow of the American Academy of Arts and Sciences
 Recognized as a Pioneer Member of the American Society of Plant Biologists.

Basic chronology 
 1919: born in New York City on February 23
 1941: A.B. magna cum laude from Harvard University
 1945: Ph.D. in biochemistry, Columbia University
 1948: an assistant professor, University of California, Berkeley
 1958: moves to University of California, Davis the Department of Biochemistry and Biophysics
 1984: retires

References 

1919 births
2007 deaths
Harvard University alumni
Columbia University alumni
American physiologists
American biochemists
University of California, Berkeley faculty
University of California, Davis faculty
Members of the United States National Academy of Sciences
Scientists from New York City